Ümran Ertiş (born 13 April 1996 in Ankara, Turkey) is a Turkish female para table tennis player of class 10 and Paralympian.

Career 
Ertiş took part at the 2012 Summer Paralympics. She competed at the women's individual class 10 event, where she could not advance to the quarterfinals after winning one game and losing two. In the event of women's team class 6–10, she advanced to the final along with Neslihan Kavas.

She won the gold medal in the women's single class 10 division at the 2013 ITTF European Para-Table Tennis Championships held in Lignano, Italy.

Achievements

Notes

1996 births
Turkish female table tennis players
Table tennis players at the 2012 Summer Paralympics
Table tennis players at the 2016 Summer Paralympics
Paralympic table tennis players of Turkey
Medalists at the 2012 Summer Paralympics
Paralympic medalists in table tennis
Paralympic silver medalists for Turkey
Sportspeople from Ankara
Living people